Mariam Khatchvani (born 1 May 1986) is a Georgian film director and screenwriter.

Biography
Khatchvani graduated in 2008 from the Shota Rustaveli Theatre and Film University, Tbilisi. She has directed many short documentaries, including Verdzoba (2006), Beyond the Window (2007), Lichanishi and Kvirikoba (2009). Dinola (2013) is her latest fiction short.

The writer and screenwriter Miho Mosulishvili writes about Dinola :
Mariam Khatchvani's 'Dinola' is a myth-ritual cinematography. A strict, ruthless and poetical story from Caucasus mountains...

Filmography

As writer and director
 Dede (2017)
 Dinola (2013)
 Lichanishi (2009), documentary
 Kvirikoba (2009), documentary
 Beknu (2008)
 Panjris mighma / Beyond the Window (2007), documentary
 Verdzoba (2007), documentary
 Will (2005)

As producer
 Lichanishi (2009), documentary
 Kvirikoba (2009), documentary

Festivals 
 European Film Academy • 2014 European Short Film Nominee
 35th International Mediterranean Film Festival of Montpellier • 2013 Short Films competition.
 36th Clermont-Ferrand International Short Film Festival • 2014 International competition
 28th FIFF Festival International de Films de Fribourg • 2014 International Competition 
 38th Hong Kong International Film Festival • 2014 International competition 
 37th Norwegian Short Film Festival in Grimstad • 2014 International competition, Nominated for EFA
 12th International Short Film Festival- In The Palace • 2014 Official selection 
 8th River Film Festival Porta Portello – Padua – Italy • 2014 Official Selections, Best Int. Short.
 11th GOLDEN APRICOT International Film Festival • 2014 international Competition 
 2nd Festival " Courts - Moments " a Cadouin, Dordogne, FRANCE • 2014 Official Selections

Honours and awards
 2014 – International Shorts First Prize at the 8th River Film Festival (Padua, Italy), for the movie Dinola
 2014 GNFC (The Georgian National Film Center) – 1st Place as a Début Project.
 2014 SOFIA MEETINGS – award for Best Project.
 2013 DAB Regional Co-Production Forum-Best Project Award
 2012 Gala (literary prize) – Awarded as Best Screenplay for 'Dede'.

References

External links

 Dinola
 On Cinemed
 LA FABRIQUE AT CANNES – Mariam Khatchvani, “Dede”

1986 births
Living people
Film directors from Georgia (country)
Screenwriters from Georgia (country)
Film people from Tbilisi